Brick Rangers GAA are a former Gaelic football team from the Abbeydorney area of North Kerry, Ireland.

History

Formed in 1979 and folded in 1994.
In 1992 / 93 NFL season, they played Ballyheigue (also not a football stronghold) in the quarter final of the St Brendans Championship (with their four Kerry Seniors in tow) and were beaten.

References
 http://kerrygaa.proboards.com/index.cgi?board=general&action=display&thread=2433

Former Gaelic Athletic Association clubs in Kerry
Gaelic games clubs in County Kerry
Gaelic football clubs in County Kerry
Association football clubs established in 1979
1979 establishments in Ireland